Megas Alexandros Kallithea Football Club was a Greek football club, based in Kastoria (Kallithea neighborhood), Kastoria, Greece.

Honours

Domestic

 Kastoria FCA champion: 3
 2015–16, 2017–18, 2019-20
 Kastoria FCA Cup Winners: 2
 2014–15, 2015–16

References

Football clubs in Western Macedonia
Kastoria (regional unit)
Association football clubs established in 1984
1984 establishments in Greece